Zaid Saloojee (born 25 May 1989) is a South African first class cricketer. He was included in the Gauteng cricket team squad for the 2015 Africa T20 Cup.

References

External links
 

1989 births
Living people
South African cricketers
Gauteng cricketers
Place of birth missing (living people)